Keavon Milton (born June 23, 1990) is a former American football offensive tackle. He played college football at Louisiana-Monroe.

Milton was a member of the NFL's New Orleans Saints, Cleveland Browns, Seattle Seahawks, New England Patriots, Dallas Cowboys, and Pittsburgh Steelers, and the BC Lions of the Canadian Football League (CFL).

Professional career

New Orleans Saints
On April 28, 2013, Milton signed with the New Orleans Saints as an undrafted free agent. On August 31, 2013, he was released.

Cleveland Browns
On September 1, 2013, Milton was claimed off waivers by the Cleveland Browns. The Browns released Milton on August 25, 2014.

Seattle Seahawks
After being cut by the Browns, Milton signed with the Seattle Seahawks. They made the playoffs with a 12-4 record, defeating the Carolina Panthers and Green Bay Packers, rolling into Super Bowl XLIX, where the Seahawks lost 28–24 to the New England Patriots.

He was released by the Seahawks on September 5, 2015.

New England Patriots
Milton was signed to the New England Patriots practice squad on November 10, 2015. On January 26, 2016, Milton signed a futures contract with the New England Patriots. On August 30, 2016, Milton was released by the Patriots.

Dallas Cowboys
On September 6, 2016, Milton was signed to the Cowboys' practice squad. He was released on October 21, 2016.

Pittsburgh Steelers
On October 25, 2016, Milton was signed to the Steelers' practice squad. He signed a reserve/future contract with the Steelers on January 24, 2017.

On September 2, 2017, Milton was waived by the Steelers.

References

External links
Louisiana-Monroe bio
New Orleans Saints bio
Cleveland Browns bio

Living people
1990 births
Louisiana–Monroe Warhawks football players
People from Canton, Texas
Players of American football from Texas
American football tight ends
New Orleans Saints players
Cleveland Browns players
Seattle Seahawks players
New England Patriots players
Dallas Cowboys players
Pittsburgh Steelers players
American football offensive tackles